Nygårds hagar (or Nygård) is a locality situated in Nykvarn Municipality, Stockholm County, Sweden with 328 inhabitants in 2010.

References 

Populated places in Nykvarn Municipality